Events in the year 1972 in Turkey.

Parliament
 14th Parliament of Turkey

Incumbents
President – Cevdet Sunay
Prime Minister:
 Nihat Erim (up to 22 May 1972)
Ferit Melen (from 22 May 1972)

Cabinet
34th government of Turkey (up to 22 May 1972)
35th government of Turkey (from 22 May 1972)

Events
 8 February – Documents about the Yenice Conference between İsmet İnönü and Winston Churchill in 1943 disclosed.
 30 March –  Some militants of People’s Liberation Army, including Mahir Çayan, killed during gunfight.
 4 May – General Kemalettin Eken is injured in a terrorist attack.
 6 May – Three members of Turkish People’s Liberation Army receive death sentences.
 8 May – İsmet İnönü resigns as chairman of CHP.
 14 May – Bülent Ecevit is the new chairman of CHP.
 28 May – Galatasaray wins the Turkish championship.
 16 July – Demetrios I elected as patriarch.
 4 September – Republican Party formed.
 1 October – Turkish boxer Cemal Kamacı wins European championship in 63.5 kg. weight category

Births
29 January – Engin Günaydın, actor and screenwriter
6 July – Levent Üzümcü, actor
17 October – Tarkan, singer

Deaths
6 January – Tevfik Rüştü Aras former foreign minister
6 May – Deniz Gezmiş and two friends, members of armed underground organization People's Liberation Army of Turkey
15 September Ulvi Cemal Erkin, composer
19 December Ahmet Emin Yalman, journalist

Gallery

See also
 1971–72 1.Lig
List of Turkish films of 1972
Turkey at the 1972 Summer Olympics

References

 
Years of the 20th century in Turkey
1972 in Europe
1972 in Asia
Turkey